Stelios Mainas (born 1 October 1957 in Ermoupoli, Syros) is a Greek actor. He graduated Veakis Drama School in 1982 and has been working as a stage, cinema and television actor ever since. His first film role was in the 1984 movie Loafing and Camouflage. He became widely known in Greece from the comedy series Oi Men Kai Oi Den and the 1998 road movie Valkanisateur. He has also appeared in movies like Hard Goodbyes: My Father (2002) and A Touch of Spice (2003). He is married to actress Katia Sperelaki.They have one son. Stelios Mainas has won the Best Actor Award in Hellenic Film Academy Awards for his role in film Tetarti 4:45.

Filmography
Loafing and Camouflage (1984)
Vios Kai Politeia (1987)
Lipotaktis (1988)
Pano Kato kai Plagios (1992)
Valkanisateur (1997)
Brazileiro (2001) 
Hard Goodbyes: My Father (2002) 
A Touch of Spice (2003) 
Guiness (2009) Ap' Ta Kokkala Vgalmena (2011)
Tetarti 04:45 (2015)
1968 (2018)

Television

References

External links

1957 births
Living people
People from Ermoupoli
Greek male stage actors
Greek male film actors
Greek male television actors